Karl Oskar Jeppson (5 January 1878, Närpes - 8 February 1931) was a Finnish farmer and politician. He was a member of the Parliament of Finland from 1922 to 1924, representing the Swedish People's Party of Finland (SFP).

References

1878 births
1931 deaths
People from Närpes
People from Vaasa Province (Grand Duchy of Finland)
Swedish-speaking Finns
Swedish People's Party of Finland politicians
Members of the Parliament of Finland (1922–24)